Benjamin Hawkins (1754–1818) was a U.S. Senator from North Carolina from 1789 to 1795. Senator Hawkins may also refer to:

C. R. Hawkins (1900–1959), Missouri State Senate
Charles R. Hawkins (born 1943), Virginia State Senate
Edward Hawkins (New York politician) (1829–1908), New York State Senate
George C. Hawkins (1918–1991), Alabama State Senate
George Sydney Hawkins (1808–1878), Florida State Senate
Henry Hawkins (politician) (1790–1845), New York State Senate
John A. Hawkins (New York politician) (1864–1941), New York State Senate
John D. Hawkins (born 1968), South Carolina State Senate
Lee Hawkins (born c. 1951), Georgia State Senate
Micajah Thomas Hawkins (1790–1858), North Carolina
Paula Hawkins (1927–2009), Florida State Senate
Simeon S. Hawkins (1827–1908), New York State Senate